Orgy in Rhythm is an album by drummer Art Blakey. It is early example of a percussion-oriented jazz record, a format Blakey had first explored in 1956 on the first side of his Drum Suite LP for Columbia. Orgy in Rhythm was recorded in 1957 for Blue Note Records, and released the same year as two LPs, Volume One and Volume Two (BLP 1554/1555). In the 1997 limited-edition CD reissue by Blue Note, it was consolidated into a single volume.

Track listing
All compositions by Art Blakey

Volume One
 "Buhaina Chant" – 10:30
 "Ya Ya" – 7:06
 "Toffi" – 12:20
 "Split Skins" – 8:58

Volume Two
"Amuck" – 6:49
 "Elephant Walk" – 6:56
 "Come Out and Meet Me Tonight" – 5:43
 "Abdallah's Delight" – 9:46

Personnel
 Art Blakey – drums, vocals (#3)
 Herbie Mann – flute
 Ray Bryant – piano
 Wendell Marshall – bass
 Sabu Martinez – percussion, vocals (#1, 6, 7)
 Ubaldo Nieto – percussion, timbales
 Evilio Quintero – percussion, maracas, cencerro
 Carlos "Patato" Valdes – percussion
 Jo Jones – drums, tympani
 Arthur Taylor – drums
 Specs Wright – drums, tympani

References

1957 albums
Art Blakey albums
Blue Note Records albums